The 1919 Maryland gubernatorial election was held on November 4, 1919. Democratic nominee Albert Ritchie defeated Republican nominee Harry Nice with 49.06% of the vote.

With a margin of 0.07%, this remains the closest gubernatorial election in Maryland history.

General election

Candidates
Major party candidates
Albert Ritchie, Democratic
Harry Nice, Republican 

Other candidates
Arthur L. Blessing, Socialist
Robert W. Stevens, Independent

Results

References

1919
Maryland
Gubernatorial